Charlotte Hussey is Montreal-based poet, literary critic and English professor at Dawson College. She completed her MA '79 at Concordia University, MFA '91 at Warren Wilson College, and PhD '99 at McGill University. Her doctorate thesis was on the twentieth-century poet H.D. She also teaches creative and academic writing at McGill University and has taught on Northern Quebec Aboriginal reserves. Outside her writing life, she is also a yoga instructor and Creativity Coach.

She participated in Dial-A-Poem Montreal 1985–1987.

Publications

Poetry

Rue Sainte Famille. Montreal, QC: Véhicule Press, 1990.
The Head Will Continue to Sing. Montreal, QC: Over The Moon, 2000.
Glossing the Spoils. Stroud, Glos: Awen Publications, May 2012.

References

yah

20th-century Canadian poets
21st-century Canadian poets
20th-century Canadian women writers
21st-century Canadian women writers
McGill University alumni
Concordia University alumni
Warren Wilson College alumni
Writers from Montreal
Living people
Year of birth missing (living people)